Kuraoka is a surname. Notable people with the surname include:

 David Kuraoka (born 1946), American ceramic artist
 Rubina Kuraoka (born 1987), Japanese German voice actress

See also
 Kuraoka Shrine

Japanese-language surnames